Crystal Wing is a steel flying roller coaster at Happy Valley in Beijing, China.  The layout of this coaster is identical to the Superman: Ultimate Flight flying coaster located at several Six Flags parks.

Roller coasters in China
Roller coasters introduced in 2006
Flying roller coasters manufactured by Bolliger & Mabillard